Beach volleyball was one of the many sports which was held at the 1998 Asian Games in Bangkok, Thailand.

Schedule

Medalists

Medal table

Participating nations
A total of 40 athletes from 9 nations competed in beach volleyball at the 1998 Asian Games:

Final standing

Men

Women

References

Results

External links
Official website

 
1998 Asian Games events
1998
Asian Games